The 2001–02 Greek Football Cup was the 60th edition of the Greek Football Cup.

Calendar

Group stage

Group 1

Group 2

Group 3

Group 4

Group 5

Group 6

Group 7

Group 8

Group 9

Group 10

Group 11

Knockout phase
Each tie in the knockout phase, apart from the final, was played over two legs, with each team playing one leg at home. The team that scored more goals on aggregate over the two legs advanced to the next round. If the aggregate score was level, the away goals rule was applied, i.e. the team that scored more goals away from home over the two legs advanced. If away goals were also equal, then extra time was played. The away goals rule was again applied after extra time, i.e. if there were goals scored during extra time and the aggregate score was still level, the visiting team advanced by virtue of more away goals scored. If no goals were scored during extra time, the winners were decided by a penalty shoot-out. In the final, which were played as a single match, if the score was level at the end of normal time, extra time was played, followed by a penalty shoot-out if the score was still level.The mechanism of the draws for each round is as follows:
There are no seedings, and teams from the same group can be drawn against each other.

Bracket

Second round

||colspan="2" rowspan="10" 

|}

Round of 16

|}

Quarter-finals

|}

Semi-finals

Summary

|}

Matches

Olympiacos won 6–2 on aggregate.

AEK Athens won 1–0 on aggregate.

Final

References

External links
Greek Cup 2001-2002 at RSSSF
Greek Cup 2001-2002 at Hellenic Football Federation's official site

Greek Football Cup seasons
Greek Cup
Cup